VUM or Vum may refer to:

 Victoria University of Manchester, a university in Manchester, England, United Kingdom
 Vlaamse Uitgeversmaatschappij (VUM Media), a Belgian media group
 VU meter, a device displaying a representation of the signal level in audio equipment